"Church of Your Heart" is the fifth and final single taken from Swedish pop duo Roxette's third studio album, Joyride (1991). Written by Per Gessle, the song was a top-20 hit in Canada, where it peaked at number 11, and charted throughout Europe, entering the top 40 in several countries. "I Call Your Name" – originally released as a single from their 1986 debut album Pearls of Passion – appeared as the B-side. On UK editions of the single, the song was backed by an exclusive megamix consisting of a medley of "It Must Have Been Love", "Listen to Your Heart", "The Look", "Joyride" and "Fading Like a Flower (Every Time You Leave)".

Critical reception
AllMusic editor Bryan Buss described the song as "folky" in his review of Joyride. Jim Farber from Entertainment Weekly wrote that Roxette adds some "Dylanesque harmonica" into "Church of Your Heart". Swedish newspaper Expressen said that the song "is the closest we come to Gyllene Tider". Gavin Report commented, "A rare lead vocal from Per gives the Roxette sound a different texture but the result is the same—a hit." I Dag stated that it "is Gessle from his best side. This could be Gyllene Tider 1991."

Music video
The music video for "Church of Your Heart" was filmed at a church in Sydney, Australia. It was directed by Wayne Isham, who also directed the video for previous single "Spending My Time", as well as one for another song from Joyride—"(Do You Get) Excited?", which was due to be released as the album's sixth single. Its planned single release was later cancelled, however.

Formats and track listings
 Cassette and 7-inch single (Europe 1364577 · US 4KM-50380)
 "Church of Your Heart" – 3:16
 "I Call Your Name" – 3:37

 UK Cassette and 7-inch single (UKEM227)
 "Church of Your Heart" – 3:16
 "Megamix" – 9:04

 CD single (Europe 1364572)
 "Church of Your Heart" – 3:18
 "I Call Your Name" – 3:37
 "Come Back (Before You Leave)" (Demo, April 1990) – 4:11
 "Soul Deep" (Tom Lord-Alge Remix) – 3:40

 UK CD1 (UKCDEM227)
 "Church of Your Heart" – 3:18
 "I Call Your Name" – 3:37
 "Come Back (Before You Leave)" (Demo) – 4:11
 "Fading Like a Flower (Every Time You Leave)" – 3:51

 UK CD2 (UKCDEMS227)
 "Church of Your Heart" – 3:18
 "I Call Your Name" – 3:37
 "Soul Deep" (Tom Lord-Alge Remix) – 3:40
 "Megamix" – 9:04

Credits and personnel
Credits are adapted from the liner notes of The Rox Box/Roxette 86–06.

Studios
 Recorded in 1990 at EMI Studios (Stockholm, Sweden)
 Mixed at EMI Studios (Stockholm, Sweden)

Musicians
 Marie Fredriksson – lead and background vocals
 Per Gessle – lead and background vocals, harmonica, mixing
 Per "Pelle" Alsing – drums
 Anders Herrlin – bass guitar, engineering
 Jonas Isacsson – guitars
 Clarence Öfwerman – keyboards, production, mixing
 Staffan Öfwerman – background vocals
 Alar Suurna – mixing, engineering

Charts

Weekly charts

Year-end charts

Release history

References

1991 songs
1992 singles
EMI Records singles
Roxette songs
Song recordings produced by Clarence Öfwerman
Songs written by Per Gessle